The Drake equation is an equation used to estimate the number of active, communicative extraterrestrial civilizations in the Milky Way galaxy.

Drake equation may also refer to:

 Drake Equation (album), a 2001 album by the American band Tub Ring
 "Drake Equation", a song by Tony Rohrbough, lead guitarist for Byzantium, from his solo album The Work